An associated reproductive pattern is a seasonal change in reproduction which is highly correlated with a change in gonad and associated hormone.

Notable Model Organisms 

 Parthenogenic Whiptail Lizards

References 

Reproduction